Naga shawls are traditional shawls with a distinctive pattern (primarily in red and black wool) made by various Naga ethnic groups from Nagaland and its neighbouring areas in Northeast India.

List of Naga shawls

Ao Naga shawls

Tsüngkotepsü 

The Tsüngkotepsü is a warrior shawl of the Ao Nagas of Nagaland. Traditionally, the Tsüngkotepsü can only be worn by warriors who had successfully taken the heads of enemy warriors, In modern times, the right to wear the Tsüngkotepsü is associated with performing a mithun sacrifice, a demonstration of wealth and are a distinctive symbol of the Ao Nagas.

Chakhesang Naga shawls 

The Chakhesang Naga shawl has the Geographical Indication Tag.
It was the third from Nagaland to be granted the GI registration after Naga King Chilli and Naga Tree Tomato. While the ‘Chakhesang Shawl’ is listed under the category of ‘Handicrafts’, the other two is registered under ‘Agricultural’ product under Geographical Indications of Goods (Registration & Protection) Act, 1999.

Notes and references

External links
https://web.archive.org/web/20090106230212/http://ignca.gov.in/craft256.htm Interesting coverage of a variety of Naga textile and other crafts.
http://www.craftandartisans.com/tribal-textiles-of-nagaland.html Tribal textiles of Nagaland

Culture of Nagaland
Indian shawls and wraps